Rabiabad (also Romanized as Rabī‘ābād; also known as Rabī‘ābād-e Tūtān, Tūtau, and Tūtū) is a village in Darmian Rural District, in the Central District of Darmian County, South Khorasan Province, Iran. At the 2006 census, its population was 83, in 17 families.

References 

Populated places in Darmian County